Abubakar Muhammad Zakaria (born 1969) is a Bangladeshi Islamic scholar, media personality, professor, writer, preacher and Islamic speaker. He is currently serving as a Professor in the Department of Fiqh and Legal Studies at Islamic University Kushtia. He has been discussing Islamic programs and Islam in various newspapers and magazines on various Bangladeshi television channels, including NTV, Peace TV and so on. He also giving sermons at various Islamic mahfils and pre-Jumu'ah prayers Khutba at various places. His "Tafsir Zakaria" has been published by King Fahad Printing Press, the official publication of Saudi Arabia, which is appreciated by the Muslim readers of Bengal.

His book "Hindusiyat wa Tasur" is in the Department of Dawah and Islamic Studies at Kushtia Islamic University. The another book "Comparative Theology and Muslim Manisha" in five courses of undergraduate, postgraduate, MPhil and PhD in the Department of Dawah and Islamic Studies, Kushtia Islamic University and one course in the syllabus of the postgraduate syllabus of the Department of Islamic Studies, University of Dhaka. Also a book titled "Comparative Review of Different Fiqhs" is included in a course of Post Graduate and MPhil of University of Chittagong.

Early life and family 
Muhammad Zakaria Majumdar was born in 1969 to a Bengali Muslim family of Majumdars in the village of Dhanusara in the Chauddagram subdivision of East Pakistan's Comilla district. His father, Muhammad Siddiqur Rahman, was the principal of the local Dhanusara Islamia Madrasa.

Education 
Abu Bakr Zakariya received his early education from his father. He passed from Dhanusara Islamia Madrasa  in 1982 and passed Alim in 1984. Then in 1986 he passed Fazil from the same madrasa. He was admitted to Dhaka Alia Madrasah in 1988.  He was first in the first class in Kamil's combined merit list.

He was admitted to the Arabic department of Dhaka University in 1986. But while studying in the second year of Dhaka University, he got admission in Islamic University of Madinah. So in 1989 he was admitted to the Shariah department of the Islamic University of Madinah. And he jointly placed fifth in the combined graduation or honors examinations of the Shariah department. He graduated from the University of Medina with a degree in Aqeedah.  After graduation, he completed his PhD on comparative theology under the supervision of  Abdullah Al-Gudayyan.

Apart from Abdullah Al-Gudayyan, Abdur Rahim, Maulana Fakhruddin, Maulana Wajihuddin and others are among his local teachers.

Career 
After completing his studies, Zakaria returned to Bangladesh and joined Islamic University, Bangladesh as a Lecturer in the Department of Fiqh. As are in charge. He was a contemporary of Islamic University teaching Khandaker Abdullah Jahangir, who simultaneously researched comparative theology and various subjects. He has also given lectures and lectured at various places on YouTube. The central theme of his speech is Aqeedah. He basically follows and propagates the Salafi ideology.

Criticism 
Muhammad Zakaria was quoted in June 2021 as criticizing Abu Taha Muhammad Adnan, another young Islamic speaker, for his religious teachings. Both of them posted videos on YouTube and Facebook targeting each other.

Published books 
Muhammad Zakariya has written books on Islam, including beliefs, Islamic law, hadith, interpretation of the Qur'an, and fiqh. The list of his books is as follows:

Bengali translations 

 Sahih Hadith Encyclopedia (1st volume) (2021), the original author: Abu Ahmad Muhammad Abdullah Azami
 Dotana Dodulyaman (Editor, 2019), Original Author: Ibn Qayyim
 Let's listen to the story of Jannat (2019), Original author: Tanbir Hasan bin Abdur Rafiq
 Ablution in a Pure Method (2016), Original Author: Professor Muhammad Nurul Islam Makki
 Usulul Iman (2016), the original author:  Mohammad Manzoor Elahi, 
 Taking Medium to Get Allah (2019), Original Author: Ahmad Bin Abdul Halim Ibn Taymi, 
 30 Asr of Ramadan (2018), Original Author: Ali Hassan Tayyab, B 
 Hajj Umrah and Pilgrimage (2016), Original by Numan Abul Bashar and Ali Hasan Tayyab, B 
 Pure Faith is the best resource of life (2016), Original Author: Shamsul Haque Chowdhury
 Shaykhul Islam Ibn Taymiyyah (Memoirs, Editor) (2019), Original Author: Ustaz Moniruddin Ahmad, 
 How to prolong life (Editor, 2016) Original author: Muhammad Ibne Ibrahim An Naeem,  ISBN
 Islam in Establishing Women's Rights (2019), Original Author: Muhsin Al Badr, B 
 Illustrated Guide to Islam (Editor, 2021), Original Author: I.  A.  Ibrahim
 In the vicinity of the great soul (2nd volume) (2021), the original authors: Imam Az-Zahabi and Muhammad Musa Ash-Sharif, B 
 In the vicinity of Mahatpran (Vol. 1) (2020), Original Author: Muhammad Musa Ash-Sharif, B .
 Great Advice (2016 Editor), Original Author: Taqiuddin Ibn Taymiyyah
 Know and understand Salat (2021, compiled), 
 Hisnul Muslim: Zikr, Doa and Medicine (2016) Original Author: Saeed Ibn Ali Al Qahtani, B
 Umdatul Ahkam (2020), Original Author: Abdul Gani Al Makdisi,

Original works

Bengali 
 Umrah (Visiting Medina, Doa) (2019), B 
 The provision of abortion in Islam (2016), co-author: Mostafa Hossain Shaheen, 
 As was the case with non-Muslims Rasul (SAW) (2016), co-author: Raghib Sarjani
 Batayan  (26 selected articles from Muslim Media Blog)  (2018)
 Women's Hajj and Umrah (2019), B 
 Muslim women and her responsibilities in the contemporary context (2019), co-author: Faleh Ibn Muhammad As-Sugair
 Rahman rises to the throne (2020)
 Tort Law in Islam (2013), co-author: Al-Amin, B 
 Speech of Eminent Scholars on Building / Organization, Building and Bai'at (2016), Co-Author: Abdul Alim Ibn Kawthar Madani
 Zakat and Sadaqah in Q&A (2016), co-author: Muhammad Nurul Islam Makki
 Comparative Religion and Muslim personality (2014) Co-author: Abdul Quader, Bangladesh University Grants Commission, 
 Usulul Iman (20--), co-author: Manzoor Elahi
 The major religions of the world (2021), co-author: Abdul Quader
 Know and understand the prayer
 Four basic terms of belief

Arabic 
His book Hindusiat wa Tasur And the two books of Shirk Phil Kadim wal Hadith are popular in the Arab world.
 Hinduism wa tasur bad al firaq al islami biha 
 Ash-Shirk fil-Qadim Wal Hadith (Ancient and modern shirk)
His book Hindusiat wa Tasur was highly praised by Abdullah bin Salam al-Batati in the program "Al-Khajanah" of Zad TV owned by Muhammad Al-Munajjid and wished to be translated in English giving the book highly importance as a detailed work on Hinduism from the Islamic perspective.

His book Ash-Shirk fil-Qadim Wal Hadith has been partially translated into Idonesian by Abu Umamah Arif Hidayatullah as "Syirik pada Zaman Dahulu dan Sekarang".

Footnote

References

External links 

 
 
 Abu Bakar Muhammad Zakaria on Islamhouse.com
 

Islamic University of Madinah alumni
Bangladeshi educators
Academic staff of the Islamic University, Bangladesh
Bangladeshi Islamists
Bangladeshi translators 
Government Madrasah-e-Alia alumni
Bangladeshi textbook writers 
Bangladeshi television personalities
Bangladeshi Sunni Muslim scholars of Islam
Bangladeshi Salafis
1969 births
Living people
People from Comilla District
Bengali Muslim scholars of Islam
Atharis